Paris is a small unincorporated community in north-central Kenosha County, Wisconsin, United States, located at U.S. Route 45 and Wisconsin Highway 142 in the town of Paris. The name was chosen by 19th century settler Seth Butler Myrick in honor of the town of his birth in Oneida County, New York. Paris is the site of the Paris Corners town cemetery. The area once had the nickname "Tar Corners", after an incident where a dispute between neighbors led to a tarring and feathering.

Notes

Unincorporated communities in Wisconsin
Unincorporated communities in Kenosha County, Wisconsin
Tarring and feathering in the United States